Chubb is a surname. Notable people with the surname include:

Adam Chubb (born 1981), American basketball player
Andrew Chubb (born 1975), Australian pianist, composer, teacher, and lecturer
Basil Chubb (1921–2002), English-born Irish political scientist
Bradley Chubb (born 1996), American football player
Caldecot Chubb (born 1950), American film producer  
Cecil Chubb (1876–1934), previous owner of Stonehenge
Charles Chubb (businessman) (1779–1846), British lock and safe manufacturer, the founder of Chubb Locks
Charles Chubb (ornithologist) (1851–1924), British ornithologist
Charles Chubb, 2nd Baron Hayter (1871–1967), British businessman
Charles E. Chubb (1845–1930), Australian judge of the Supreme Court of Queensland
Geoff Chubb (1911–1982), South African cricketer
George Chubb, 1st Baron Hayter (1848–1946), British businessman
George Chubb, 3rd Baron Hayter KCVO CBE (1911–2003), British industrialist and politician
Ian Chubb (born 1943), Vice-chancellor of the Australian National University
Jeremiah Chubb (1793–1860), British inventor of the Chubb detector lock, brother of businessman Charles Chubb
John Chubb (artist) 1746–1818, English amateur artist of Bridgwater, Somerset.
John Chubb (locksmith) (1816–1872), British lock and safe manufacturer
Lawrence Chubb (1873–1948), British environmentalist 
Melvin F. Chubb Jr. (1934-2014), United States Air Force lieutenant general 
Nick Chubb (born 1995), American football player
Paul Chubb (1949–2002), Australian film and television actor
Ralph Chubb (1892–1960), British poet
Thomas Chubb (1679–1747), English Deist philosopher
William Chubb, 4th Baron Hayter (born 1943), British businessman

Fictional characters
Arthur "Fatboy" Chubb, a character in the soap opera EastEnders